The Fédération Nationale des Eclaireurs et Eclaireuses du Luxembourg (National Scout and Guide Federation of Luxembourg, FNEL) is one of Luxembourg's Scouting and Guiding organizations. It is a member of the federation Scouting in Luxembourg.

This secular association is open to all boys and girls of all religions, race and nationalities. It has about 2,000 members.

History
Secular scouting in Luxembourg started in 1914. In 1916, twelve local Scout groups founded the Fédération Nationale des Eclaireurs du Luxembourg. The federation was among the founding members of the World Organization of the Scout Movement (WOSM) in 1922. In 1940, under the German occupation, Scouting was banned in Luxembourg. The Scout groups went underground, some members were arrested in concentration camps.

In 1945, the FNEL and the Lëtzebuerger Scouten founded the Luxembourg Boy Scouts Association onto which the WOSM membership was transferred. The former boys-only FNEL opened to girls in 1966 and added the words et Eclaireuses (and Girl Guides) to its name in 1971.

in 2014, the Association des Girl Guides Luxembourgeoises moved its remaining members into the FNEL and terminated its activities.

Program
The FNEL is one of the very few Scouting and Guiding organizations that is still today heavily influenced by the ideas of Ernest Thompson Seton and his Woodcraft movement.

The organization has five age divisions:
Beavers – ages 5 to 7
Wëllefcher (Cub Scouts) – ages 8 to 11
Scouten and Guiden (Scouts and Guides) – ages 12 to 14
Explorers – ages 15 to 18
Routiers (Rover Scouts) – ages 18 to 26

Motto, Scout Oath and Law
The association's motto is "Trei zum Land" (Loyal to the country).

Scout Oath
Ech versprieche op meng Eier, mei Bescht ze dunn,
fir meng Pflichten ze erfëllen geintiwwer (Gott,) dem Land an dem Troun, 
denen dei an Nout sin ze hellefen
an d'Scoutsgesetz (d'Guidegesetz) ze befollegen.

I promise on my honor to do my best
to fulfill my duties to (God,) the country and the throne,
to help those in troubles
and to follow the Scout (Guide) Law.

Scout Law
E Scout (Eng Guide) huet Disziplin.A Scout (a Guide) shows discipline.
E Scout (Eng Guide) as offen a héiferlech.A Scout (a Guide) is open and helpful.
All Scouten a Guide sin Bridder a Schwesteren.All Scouts and Guides are brothers and sisters.
E Scout (Eng Guide) mécht säi (hiirt) Bescht fir all denen déi a Nout sin ze hëllefen.A Scout (a Guide) does his (her) best helping all people in troubles.
E Scout (Eng Guide) mécht all Dag a gudd Wierk.A Scout (a Guide) does a Good Turn each day.
E Scout (Eng Guide) as gudd mat den Déiren, a respektéiert d'Natur.A Scout (a Guide) is good to the animals and respects nature.
E Scout (Eng Guide) hëlt alles vun der gudder Säit.A Scout (a Guide) always looks at the bright side.
E Scout (Eng Guide) respektéiert wat anere gehéiert.A Scout (a Guide) respects property.
E Scout (Eng Guide) as propper u Läif a Séil; hie (si) seet a mécht näischt Schlechtes.A Scout (a Guide) is clean on body and soul; he (she) doesn't say and do bad things.

External links
Official website

References 

World Organization of the Scout Movement member organizations
Organisations based in Luxembourg City
Scouting and Guiding in Luxembourg
Youth organizations established in 1916